The Pittsburg Pirates was the name of three historic minor league baseball teams, based in Pittsburg, Kansas. The first Pirates' team played 1909 as a member of the class-C Western Association. Over a decade later, a second Pirates' team played in the class-D Southwestern League for the 1921 season. 

On July 7, 1952, when the Bartlesville Pirates, a class-D affiliate of the Pittsburgh Pirates in the Kansas-Oklahoma-Missouri League, relocated from Oklahoma to finish their 1952 season in Kansas.

Season-by-season

* Bartlesville Pirates moved to Pittsburg July 7, 1952

Pittsburg, Kansas
Defunct minor league baseball teams
Pittsburgh Pirates minor league affiliates
Defunct baseball teams in Kansas
Professional baseball teams in Kansas
Baseball teams established in 1909
Sports clubs disestablished in 1921
1909 establishments in Kansas
1921 disestablishments in Kansas
Defunct Western Association teams
Baseball teams disestablished in 1952